The discography of Liberty X, a British pop band, consists of three studio albums, twelve singles and a number of other appearances. The group's first two singles "Thinking It Over" and "Doin' It" launched them to fame, "Thinking It Over" shot to number 5 and "Doin' It" peaked at number 14. Their third single, "Just a Little" took the band straight to the top of the UK charts, next single "Got to Have Your Love" peaked at number two. This release was preceded by their debut album, Thinking It Over peaking at number 3 in the UK. The final single to be taken from the album was "Holding On for You", released in December 2002 and which debuted and peaked at number 5.

Following a short break, the group released "Being Nobody", a mashup of Chaka Khan's "Ain't Nobody" and The Human League's "Being Boiled". "Being Nobody" reached number three in the UK singles chart. Preceding their second album, Being Somebody, the group released "Jumpin", which managed to peak at number 6. Being Somebody was released on 3 November 2003, debuting at number 12 on the UK Albums Chart. The group released the album's final single 'Everybody Cries' in January 2004. The single missed the UK Top 10, reaching a disappointing number 13. The group were to re-release Being Somebody, and was to feature a cover version of the Kool & the Gang song "Fresh" which was released in a selection of European countries, but not the United Kingdom. It peaked at number 35 on the French music charts.

Their third album, titled X, was released in October 2005. The first single, "Song 4 Lovers" reached number 5, the album peaked at number 27. Second single "A Night to Remember", a cover of the Shalamar classic entered and peaked at number 6 in the official British singles chart. It also peaked at number 16 in France, their biggest hit there since "Just a Little". The third single was a slightly remixed "X". The song failed to hit the Top 40, peaking at a low number 47. "X" also peaked at number 89 in France, their lowest chart placing there, just ahead of "Holding On for You", which reached number 109. In 2012 the group reformed for an ITV2 series showing them rehearsing for a one-off comeback performance in 2013.

Albums

Studio albums

Compilation albums

Singles

As main artist

As featuring artist

Promotional singles

Other appearances

Videography

Video albums

Music videos

References

Discographies of British artists
Pop music group discographies